Goede tijden, slechte tijden, also known as GTST or simply Goede tijden, is the longest-running Dutch soap opera, which began on 1 October 1990 on RTL4. The programme was the first daily (every workday) soap in the Netherlands and Europe. The soap is produced by Joop van den Ende and to date over 6,300 episodes have been broadcast. It was inspired by the Australian soap The Restless Years, although it started following its own course during the third season. GTST is broadcast Monday to Friday at 20:00. At its peak, around 1.5 million viewers watched each episode. Nowadays, the show is watched linearly by a total of 800.000 viewers, with an additional 300.000 viewers on streaming platform Videoland. It is the highest-rated soap opera in the Netherlands.

The soap mainly revolves around the lives of the families Alberts, Sanders, De Jong, Van Houten and Bouwhuis. It all takes place in the fictional town of Meerdijk. Like any other soap, marriage, divorce, kidnapping and business are a few of the ingredients of GTST, although in recent years, GTST has become known for writing and producing more controversial storylines. GTST is also known for having a summer break each year, ending a season sometime in June with a cliffhanger, only to resume three months later in September. Although the early cliffhangers often revolved around family drama, later cliffhangers have often revolved around disasters and unexpected twists.

Many former actors who once were part of the cast are now well known in the Netherlands and Europe, such as Katja Schuurman, Reinout Oerlemans and Antonie Kamerling.

In 2014, a gay marriage took place in the soap opera, this was the first time this happened on the Dutch television.

In 2016, the show got a spin-off called Nieuwe Tijden (English: New Times), which follows some of the younger characters from GTST and some new characters as they go off to college. Nieuwe Tijden was cancelled in 2018.

Cast

Present characters

Recurring cast

Original cast members

See also 
 Gute Zeiten, schlechte Zeiten, a German version
 List of longest-serving soap opera actors

References

External links

Goede Tijden, Slechte Tijden website 
Live event GTST
GTST Gemist

Dutch television soap operas
1990 Dutch television series debuts
1990s Dutch television series
2000s Dutch television series
2010s Dutch television series
Gay-related television shows
Non-Australian television series based on Australian television series
RTL 4 original programming